Hossein Qajeyi (born September 5, 1958 in Zarrin Shahr, Lenjan County, Isfahan, Iran, died May 5, 1982 in Khorramshahr, Khorramshahr County, Khuzestan Province, Iran) was one of the commanders of 27th Mohammad Rasulullah Division in the Iran-Iraq war.

Life
Hossein Qajeyi was born in Zarrinshahr, Isfahan province on November 26, 1979. He continued his elementary education until he received a diploma in his hometown and then he went to military service. He entered the political struggles at the age of sixteen in year 1974. He emigrated to Qom in year 1977. When he was in Qom, arrested by SAVAK agents because of his political struggles. He was one of the freestyle wrestlers in the 48 kg and 52 kg categories. Some of his achievements was winning the Youth Wrestling Championship for three years and winning the Isfahan province wrestling championship for four years.

Political activities
Before Iranian Revolution with the rise of activities against the Pahlavi dynasty, at the late of his education season, he began the political and religious activities, therewith was wanted by SAVAK and finally was arrested in Qom. When he was released, he continued his activities in the cities Shiraz and Zarrin Shahr.

His activities after Iranian Revolution
 Formation of the Islamic Revolution Committees of Zarrin Shahr
 Formation of the Islamic Revolutionary Guard Corps of Zarrin Shahr
 Formation of the Zarrin Shahr Drug Committee
 Marivan Artillery Commander
 Corps commander of Dezli, Kurdistan - Marivan axis
 Commander of the Islamic Revolutionary Guard Corps of Marivan
 One of the founders and commanders of the Brigade of Muhammad Rasoolullah
 Salman Battalion Commander in Operation Beit ol-Moqaddas

Major victories
 Commander of the operation of the Sanandaj Officers Club siege in year 1978
 Cleansing and liberating Dezli, Kurdistan and Qaleh-ye Hadi Chakmeh Siah from Komala Party of Iranian Kurdistan and the Democrats
 Commander of the liberation and clearance of the Strait of Chazabeh in the Operation Tariq al-Qods, which was called one of the masterpieces of the Iran–Iraq War
 Salman Battalion Commander in Operation Beit ol-Moqaddas which was named as the key to the Liberation of Khorramshahr

Death
During the Liberation of Khorramshahr Operation, Salman Farsi Battalion under commanded Hossein Qajeyi, succeeded in disposing of the third heavy counterattack of two armored and mechanized brigade of Iraqi Army on the Ahwaz-Khorramshahr road. During this three-day resistance, most of the battalion troops and Hossein Qajeyi were killed. The incident took place on May 5, 1982. His body was buried in the burial place of martyrs in Zarrin Shahr that called Golestan-e Shohada.

Comments about him
Experts believe that the three-day resistance of the Salman Farsi Battalion under commanded Hossein Qajeyi during the Liberation of Khorramshahr Operation on the Ahwaz-Khorramshahr road is the key to liberate Khorramshahr.

Books written about him
 Pahlevan-e Goud-e Garmdasht By Gol'ali Baba'yi (the book is written in Persian and its title means "The hero of a place called 'Goud-e Garmdasht")
 Kash Ou Ra Mishenakh'tam By Ahmadreza Madhi (the book ts written in Persian and its title means "I wish I knew him")
 Mesle Khodash By Ali Hashemi (the book is written in Persian and its title means "Like himself")
 Al'an Vaght-e Esterahat Nist By Ahmadreza Madhi (the book is written in Persian and its title means "Now is not the time to rest")

See also
 Iran–Iraq War
 List of Iranian commanders in the Iran–Iraq War
 Mohsen Vezvaei
 Islamic Revolutionary Guard Corps
 Basij
 Liberation of Khorramshahr
 Operation Beit ol-Moqaddas
 Operation Tariq al-Qods
 27th Mohammad Rasulullah Division

References

External links
 Tebyan Website
 Sajed Website 
 Defapress Website

1958 births
1982 deaths
Islamic Revolutionary Guard Corps personnel of the Iran–Iraq War
Military personnel from Isfahan
Recipients of the Order of Fath
Islamic Revolutionary Guard Corps brigadier generals
Iranian military personnel killed in the Iran–Iraq War